Presidential elections were held in Bulgaria on 23 October 2011, with a runoff held on 30 October 2011. Incumbent president Georgi Parvanov was not eligible for re-election; the Constitution of Bulgaria limits a president to two terms. No candidate won outright in the first round, resulting in a runoff between the eventual winner, Rosen Plevneliev of GERB, and Ivaylo Kalfin of the Bulgarian Socialist Party.

Background
The presidential elections were held in conjunction with local elections, saving the country BGN 8 million according to the finance minister Simeon Djankov. However, the move drew criticism from the US Ambassador in Sofia, James Warlick, who said that the move led to poor administration during the elections.

Candidates
There are 18 registered candidates. Rosen Plevneliev, Ivaylo Kalfin, and Meglena Kuneva were expected to have the best chance of reaching the second round. The candidates are:

Opinion polls

First round

Conduct

MPs interfering with the ballot count
Two GERB MPs were photographed at the Sofia electoral commission amid the chaos that erupted at the Sofia commission right after the first round of presidential and local elections. These two MPs were not authorized to be present at the electoral commission at that time: an offence under Bulgarian law. One of the GERB MPs, Stanislav Ivanov, was photographed carrying a large bag around the Sofia Electoral Commission building. This bag was presumably full of ballots. The Central Electoral Commission held a meeting on the case but failed to reach a decision, because voting could not reach the required 2/3 majority.

Universiada Hall crisis

Members of electoral committees were held without rest or sleep for 30 to 34 hours. Universiada Hall was not aired, was stunningly cold and members of committees were not given food and water, and not allowed to go outside the Hall to buy such. Journalists and observers were not allowed in Universiada Hall and a large region around it was slipped off with police until the next day late afternoon and early evening.

In the day of the elections and day after one member of Municipal Committee in Varna died, six ambulances arrived at Universiada Hall to assist fainted committee members, while the number of fainted man and women, and those suffering health problems during and after elections is not known, according to witnesses people were fainting in the Hall and at the queues for delivering elections protocols, and in the first lines at the committee members meeting in Universiada people were in constant fainted and wakening cycles condition because of lack of air, cold, malnutrition and exhausture.

People slept on floor, on bags with bulletins and even some left Universiada Hall unlawfully with taking the bulletins with themselves at home because of the poor conditions.

In the first announcement of the situation no politician or Central Committee member expressed any sorry or apology for it and party GERB said that the reason of this was the one-hour delay of the starting of the electoral day but in fact the starting of the electoral day was marked by no voters in the first 2 hours, while people was arriving at sections to vote around 8 am.

After the scandal of the situation of people still at Universiada Hall sparked in media, it was announced that committee members held there will receive 60 lv or 30 Euro more as a compensation for the long hours stay.

International statements
The PACE delegation noted that whilst the election was conducted in a generally orderly and peaceful way, there remained concerns about a lack of an equal access to the media, blurred distinctions between newspaper editorials and political advertisements, the lack of a dedicated voter roll and the candidate registration system which particularly affected independent candidates. PACE also recommended that voting for expatriate Bulgarians should be improved. The OCSE delegation also noted concerns about the blurred lines in media coverage, as well as vote-buying allegations, restrictions on using minority languages in campaigns, and inflammatory statements by some candidates.

Results

References

External links
NSD: European Election Database - Bulgaria publishes regional level election data; allows for comparisons of election results, 1990-2011

Bulgaria
Presidential elections in Bulgaria
Presidential election
October 2011 events in Europe